Maghalie Rochette (born 20 April 1993) is a Canadian cyclist, who specializes in cyclo-cross.

Major results

Cyclo-cross

2013–2014
 2nd Catamount Grand Prix 1 & 2
2014–2015
 1st  Pan American Under-23 Championships
 1st  National Under-23 Championships
 2nd National Championships
 2nd Cincy3 Harbin Park
 2nd Ellison Park Festival 2
 3rd Gran Prix of Gloucester 2
 3rd Manitoba Grand Prix
2015–2016
 1st Manitoba Grand Prix
2016–2017
 1st  National Championships
 1st Supercross Cup Day 1 & 2
 1st The Cycle-Smart Northampton International
 3rd  Pan American Championships
 5th UCI World Championships
2017–2018
 2nd National Championships
 2nd Rochester Day 1 & 2
 2nd KMC CrossFest Day 1 & 2
2018–2019
 1st  Pan American Championships
 1st  National Championships
 1st RenoCross
 1st Rochester Cyclocross Day 1 & 2
 2nd Jingle Cross Day 3
 2nd Charm City Cross Day 1
 3rd Silver Goose Festival
2019–2020
 1st  Pan American Championships
 1st  National Championships
 UCI World Cup
1st Iowa City
 1st Jingle Cross Day 2
 1st Resolution 'Cross Cup 1 & 2
 1st Silver Goose Cyclocross Festival
 1st Rochester Cyclocross Day 1 & 2
 1st FayetteCross Day 1
 1st Cincinnati Cyclocross - Kingswood Park Day 1 & 2
2020–2021
 1st Internationals Radquer Steinmaur
 EKZ CrossTour
2nd Bern
2021–2022
 USCX Series
1st Rochester Day 1 & 2
1st Charm City Cross Day 2
1st Kings CX Day 1 & 2
 UCI World Cup
2nd Besançon
3rd Val di Sole
 2nd Gullegem

Road
2021
 2nd Road race, National Road Championships

References

External links

1992 births
Living people
Cyclo-cross cyclists
Canadian female cyclists
People from Laurentides
Sportspeople from Quebec